A personal information manager (often referred to as a PIM tool or, more simply, a PIM) is a type of application software that functions as a personal organizer. The acronym PIM is now, more commonly, used in reference to personal information management as a field of study. As an information management tool, a PIM tool's purpose is to facilitate the recording, tracking, and management of certain types of "personal information".

Scope
Personal information can include any of the following:
 Address books
 Alerts
 A digital calendar with calendar dates, such as:
 Anniversaries
 Appointments 
 Birthdays
 Events
 Meetings
 Education records
 Email addresses
 Fax communications
 Itineraries
 Instant message archives
 Legal documents
 Lists (such as reading lists, task lists)
 Medical information, such as healthcare provider contact information, medical history, prescriptions
 Passwords and login credentials
 Personal file collections (digital and physical): documents, music, photos, videos and similar
 Personal diary/journal/memos/notes
 Project management features
 Recipes
 Reference materials (including scientific references, websites of interest)
 RSS/Atom feeds
 Reminders
 Voicemail communications

Synchronization 
Some PIM/PDM software products are capable of synchronizing data over a computer network, including mobile ad hoc networks (MANETs). This feature typically stores the personal data on cloud drives allowing for continuous concurrent data updates/access, on the user's computers, including desktop computers, laptop computers, and mobile devices, such a personal digital assistants or smartphones.)

History
Prior to the introduction of the term "Personal digital assistant" ("PDA") by Apple in 1992, handheld personal organizers such as the Psion Organiser  and the Sharp Wizard were also referred to as "PIMs".

The time management and communications functions of PIMs largely migrated from PDAs to smartphones, with  Apple, RIM (Research In Motion, now BlackBerry), and others all manufacturing smartphones that offer most of the functions of earlier PDAs.

See also
Calendar
Calendaring software
Comparison of note-taking software
Information management
Information system
List of personal information managers
List of wiki software
Password manager
Personal information management
Personal knowledge base
Personal organizer
Personal wiki

References

External links
 
  A list of research Personal information managers.
 ISO 27701:2019 Personal information management system and GDPR documentation requirements
 Steps to be followed while implementing ISO/IEC 27701 based Personal information management system

 Personal information manager